Crisis Center of Tampa Bay is a private nonprofit organization in Tampa, Florida, that provides services and support for a variety of crisis situations including sexual assault, sexual abuse, domestic violence, financial distress, substance abuse, medical emergency, or suicidal thoughts.

The Crisis Center of Tampa Bay receives roughly 2,000 calls per week and 120–150 will be from someone on the verge of taking their own life.

History
What is now the Crisis Center of Tampa Bay was formed from the mergers of previous non-profit organizations including the Suicide and Crisis Hotline (established in 1972), the Sexual Abuse Treatment Center (incorporated in 1974), and the Hillsborough County Crisis Center (incorporated in 1978). In 1999 the organization rebranded as the Crisis Center of Tampa Bay. Clara Reynolds is the current CEO of the Crisis Center of Tampa Bay. The Crisis Center of Tampa Bay is consistently rated as one of the top places to work in Tampa. The Crisis Center of Tampa Bay serves about 350 sexual assault survivors every year and in each case also provides survivors a set of new clothes.

Services
The Crisis Center of Tampa Bay offers various services to the community. The holiday periods see an increased need for services.
 TransCare, provides primary 9-1-1 Basic Life Support services in Tampa and countywide psychiatric transports to area hospitals
 Corbett Trauma Center, care coordination
 Suicide and Crisis Hotline, counselors available to listen and initiate emergency rescue if necessary
 Rape Hotline, counselors help people manage emotions and make plans to deal with their situation after the trauma of sexual assault
 Substance Abuse Hotline, counselors provide options to individuals and families affected by addiction
 2-1-1 at your fingertips, a resource database for community members to search for services
 Florida Veterans Support Line

References

External links
 Crisis Center of Tampa Bay

Tampa, Florida
Organizations based in Tampa, Florida
Non-profit organizations based in Florida
Medical and health organizations based in Florida
Mental health organizations in Florida
Suicide prevention